Palabuhanratu Bay or Pelabuhan Ratu  Sundanese for: Harbor of the Queen, is the largest bay on the coast of the Indian Ocean in the south of West Java.  Palabuhanratu fishing village is the major sea port of the bay. Geographically, Palabuhanratu Bay is located at positions 6 ° 57 'to 7 ° 07' LS and 106 ° 22 'to 106 ° 33' BT with a coastline of 105 km. The bay is U-shaped.

Palabuhanratu Bay is also known for it marine life and lobster diversity in particular.
Several rivers flow into  Palabuhanratu Bay, some of which are the following: 
Cimandiri River 
Cibareno River 
Cikanteh River

References

Bays of the Indian Ocean
Bays of Indonesia
Sukabumi Regency
Tourist attractions in West Java